Domingo is an album by saxophonist/composer Benny Golson that was recorded in Paris in 1991 and released on the French Dreyfus label.

Reception

The AllMusic review by Scott Yanow said "Tenor-saxophonist Benny Golson reunites with his longtime associate Curtis Fuller for this enjoyable set of hard bop ... Golson and Fuller both sound very much in their musical prime. The tenor's sound at this point had become quite a bit harder than previously, at times fairly close to Archie Shepp's, but he swung as hard as ever. Fuller in contrast is unchanged from his earlier days. Together they play in top form".

Track listing 
All compositions by Benny Golson except where noted
 "My Blues House" – 8:41
 "Domingo" – 7:57
 "In Your Own Sweet Way" (Dave Brubeck) – 9:34
 "Thinking Mode" – 9:27
 "Moment to Moment" – 6:48
 "Time Speaks" – 9:20
 "A La Mode" (Curtis Fuller) – 9:02
 "Blues March" – 4:09

Personnel 
Benny Golson – tenor saxophone
Curtis Fuller – trombone
Kevin Hays – piano
James Genus - bass 
Tony Reedus – drums 
Jean-Loup Longnon – trumpet (track 8)

References 

Benny Golson albums
1992 albums
Dreyfus Records albums